Cistugo is a genus of bats from southern Africa. The two species have historically been included in the genus Myotis (family Vespertilionidae), but molecular studies show that the genus is distinct from all other Vespertilionidae, and in fact distinctive enough to be placed in its own family, Cistugidae.

The two species are:
Cistugo lesueuri Roberts, 1919 – Lesotho and southern South Africa
Cistugo seabrai Thomas, 1912 – southwestern Angola through Namibia and northwestern South Africa

References

Literature cited
Lack, J.B., Roehrs, Z.P., Stanley, C.E., Ruedi, M. and Van Den Bussche, R.A. 2010. Molecular phylogenetics of Myotis indicate familial-level divergence for the genus Cistugo (Chiroptera) (subscription required). Journal of Mammalogy 91(4):976–992.
Simmons, N.B. 2005. Order Chiroptera. Pp. 312–529 in Wilson, D.E. and Reeder, D.M. (eds.). Mammal Species of the World: A Taxonomic and Geographic Reference. 3rd ed. Baltimore: The Johns Hopkins University Press, 2 vols., 2142 pp. 

 
Bat genera
Taxa named by Oldfield Thomas